Mickaël Ladhuie (born 4 February 1982) is a French rugby union player. His position is Hooker and he currently plays for Montpellier in the Top 14. He began his career with US Colomiers making just one appearance before moving to SC Albi, helping them win promotion to the Top 14. In 2007 he joined USA Perpignan, before moving to Montpellier Hérault Rugby in 2008. Since 2008 he has been a squad player with Montpellier.

References

1982 births
Living people
French rugby union players
Rugby union players from Toulouse
Montpellier Hérault Rugby players
Rugby union hookers
US Colomiers players
SC Albi players
USA Perpignan players